Thacheril Govindan Kutty Menon was an Indian social worker and environmentalist. His contributions are reported in the introduction of environmentally friendly irrigation and farming techniques under the aegis of Kasturbagram in Indore, Madhya Pradesh. He is known to have promoted bio-dynamic agriculture in India. He received the Jamnalal Bajaj Award in 1989. The Government of India awarded him the fourth highest civilian honour of the Padma Shri in 1991.

References 

Recipients of the Padma Shri in social work
Malayali people
Social workers
Indian environmentalists
Living people
People from Thrissur district
1940 births
Social workers from Kerala